Club Juventud Cambados is a Spanish football club based in the municipality of Cambados. They currently play in Segunda Autonómica – Group 11, the seventh tier of Spanish football.

The club achieved some success in 1989-92, thanks to the backing of kindly drug Lord, Sito Miñanco. At its peak the club came 4th in Spain's third tier of football. However, following Miñanco's arrest and the subsequent drying up on funding, CJ Cambados lost most of its top players.

Season to season

3 seasons in Segunda División B
11 seasons in Tercera División

Notable players
 Dani Abalo

References

External links
Official website
senafutbolmarin.blogspot.com.es profile

Football clubs in Galicia (Spain)
Divisiones Regionales de Fútbol clubs
Association football clubs established in 1963
1963 establishments in Spain